Eddie G. Robinson Memorial Stadium is a 19,600-seat multi-purpose stadium in Grambling, Louisiana. It opened in 1983 and is home to the Grambling State Tigers football team and Grambling High School Kittens football team.  The stadium is named in honor of famous Grambling State University head football coach, Eddie Robinson. It replaced Grambling Stadium. The stadium is oftentimes affectionately referred to as "The Hole" due to the topography of the stadium area.

In 2017, approximately $2 million worth of stadium upgrades were completed. Included in the upgrades were installing new artificial turf, a new larger scoreboard,  additional parking and additional tailgating areas.

Gallery

See also
List of NCAA Division I FCS football stadiums

References

External links
 Grambling State Tigers football

College football venues
Grambling State Tigers football
American football venues in Louisiana
High school football venues in Louisiana
Multi-purpose stadiums in the United States
Sports venues in Grambling, Louisiana